Odessky (masculine), Odesskaya (feminine), or Odesskoye (neuter) may refer to:
Odessky District, a district of Omsk Oblast, Russia
Odesskoye, a rural locality (a selo) in Odessky District of Omsk Oblast, Russia